Peg Kehret (born Margaret Ann Schulze on November 11, 1936) is an American author, primarily writing for children between the ages of 10 and 15.

Life

Margaret Ann Schulze was born on November 11, 1936, in La Crosse, Wisconsin. She contracted polio at age 12 in 1949. She had each of the three types of polio: spinal, respiratory, and the least common kind, bulbar. She was paralyzed from the neck down and had a nine-month hospital stay. The experience changed Kehret's life, as she describes in her memoir Small Steps: The Year I Got Polio. Kehret made a complete recovery, later graduating from Austin High School and then attending the University of Minnesota for one year. In 1955, she married Carl Kehret; they moved to California and adopted two children, Bob and Anne.

In 1970, the Kehrets moved to Washington. Carl died in 2004. Kehret has four grandchildren: Brett, Chelsea, Eric, and Mark. She has a great-grandson, Seth, who also lives in Washington. Kehret currently resides near Mt. Rainier National Park.

Career
Before Kehret began writing children's books, she wrote plays, radio commercials and magazine stories. She has published forty-six works for middle school students, including four children's drama books. Some of Kehret's most famous works include Stolen Children, Small Steps: The Year I Got Polio, and Runaway Twin.

Awards and recognition
Peg Kehret's books for young people have earned a wide readership and critical acclaim. Among her many honors are the Pen Center West Award in Children's Literature, the Golden Kite Award from the Society of Children's Book Writers and illustrators. Children's Choice Awards from 29 states, the Forest Roberts Playwriting Award, and the Henry Bergh Award from the ASPCA. Many for her books have been selected by the American Library Association for its Recommended Books for Reluctant Readers. In total, her books have won more than fifty state young reader awards.

Kehret's polio memoir received a starred review from Kirkus Reviews, won the 1998 Dorothy Canfield Fisher Children's Book Award, annually determined by a vote of Vermont schoolchildren, and the 1999 Mark Twain Readers Award, a similar annual book award determined by a vote of Missouri schoolchildren in grades 4 to 6. The award recognized four of her books from 1999 to 2012: Abduction!, Runaway Twin, Small Steps: The Year I Got Polio, and Stolen Children.

Selected works

Fiction 

Deadly Stranger (Dodd, Mead, 1987) 
Nightmare Mountain (Dutton, 1989) 
Sisters, Long Ago (Dutton, 1990) 
Cages (Dutton, 1991) 
Night of Fear (Dutton, 1994) 
The Richest Kids in Town (Dutton, 1994) 
Earthquake Terror (Dutton, 1996) 
Searching for Candlestick Park (Dutton, 1997) 
The Secret Journey (Simon & Schuster, 1999) 
I'm Not Who You Think I Am (Dutton, 1999) 
My Brother Made Me Do It (Simon & Schuster, 2000) 
Don't Tell Anyone (Dutton, 2000) 
Saving Lilly (Aladdin, 2001) 
Escaping the Giant Wave (Simon & Schuster Books for Young Readers, 2003) 
Abduction! (Dutton, 2006) 
The Ghost's Grave (Dutton, 2005) 
Stolen Children (Dutton, 2008) 
Runaway Twin (Dutton, 2009) 
Ghost Dog Secrets (Dutton, 2010) 
Dangerous Deception (Dutton, 2014)

Disaster series 

 The Volcano Disaster (Simon & Schuster, 1998) 
 The Blizzard Disaster (Minstrel, 1998) 
 Flood Disaster (Minstrel, 1999)

Ellen and Corey series 

 Terror at the Zoo (Dutton, 1992) 
 Horror at the Haunted House (Dutton, 1992) 
Danger at the Fair (Dutton, 1995)

Frightmares series 

Cat Burglar on the Prowl (Minstrel, 1995) 
Bone Breath and the Vandals (Simon & Schuster, 1995) 
Don't Go Near Mrs. Tallie (Minstrel, 1995) 
Desert Danger (Aladdin, 1995) 
The Ghost Followed Us Home (Minstrel, 1996) 
Race to Disaster (Minstrel, 1996) 
Screaming Eagles (Aladdin, 1996) 
Backstage Fright (Minstrel, 1996)

Pete the Cat series 

 The Stranger Next Door (Dutton, 2002) 
 Spy Cat (Dutton, 2003) 
 Trapped (Dutton, 2006)

Drama 

Let Him Sleep 'Till It's Time for His Funeral (Hanbury Plays, 1976), 
Spirit! (Pioneer Drama Service, 1979)
Winning Monologues for Young Actors: 65 honest-to-life characterizations to delight young actors and audiences of all ages (Colorado Springs, CO: Meriwether Publishing, 1986) 
Encore!: More Winning Monologues for Young Actors : 63 More Honest-to-Life Monologues for Teenage Boys and Girls (Meriwether, 1988)  
Acting Natural (Meriwether Publishing, 1991) 
 Tell It Like It Is: Fifty Monologues for Talented Teens (Meriwether Publishing, 2007)

Nonfiction 

 Vows of Love and Marriage (Meriwether Publishing, 1980) 
 Refinishing and Restoring Your Piano (Blue Ridge Summit, PA: Tab Books, 1985) 
 Wedding Vows: How to Express Your Love in Your Own Words (Meriwether Publishing, 1989) 
 Small Steps: The Year I Got Polio (Morton Grove, IL: Albert Whitman, 1996) 
 Shelter Dogs: Amazing Stories of Adopted Strays (Perfection Learning, 1999) 
Five Pages A Day: A Writer's Journey (Albert Whitman & Company, 2002) 
Animals Welcome: A Life of Reading, Writing, and Rescue (Dutton Children's Books, 2012)

References

Further reading 

 Interview of Kehret (2010-03-13) at TeenInk
 "Author Peg Kehret: If You Want to Write, Be a Reader" (2016-07-29 by Emily Pyrek) in the La Crosse Tribune
 Something About the Author (1993), vol. 73, p. 113–14 
 Something About the Author (2000), vol. 108, p. 130–35

External links

 
Peg Kehret papers in the Children's Literature Research Collections, University of Minnesota 
 
 

American children's writers
1936 births
Living people
Writers from La Crosse, Wisconsin
People with polio
American women children's writers
21st-century American women